Quinjalca District is one of twenty-one districts of the province Chachapoyas in Peru.

References

1861 establishments in Peru
Districts of the Chachapoyas Province
Districts of the Amazonas Region